The "Powell Doctrine" is a journalist-created term, named after General Colin Powell, for a doctrine that Powell created in the run-up to the 1990–1991 Gulf War. The doctrine poses questions emphasizing national security interests, overwhelming strike capabilities with an emphasis on ground forces, and widespread public support, all of which have to be answered affirmatively before military action is taken. Powell's doctrine is based in large part on the Weinberger Doctrine, devised by Caspar Weinberger during his tenure as Secretary of Defense (at which time Powell was Weinberger's senior military assistant).

Summary
The Powell Doctrine states that a list of questions all have to be answered affirmatively before military action is taken by the United States:
 Is a vital national security interest threatened?
 Do we have a clear attainable objective?
 Have the risks and costs been fully and frankly analyzed?
 Have all other non-violent policy means been fully exhausted?
 Is there a plausible exit strategy to avoid endless entanglement?
 Have the consequences of our action been fully considered?
 Is the action supported by the American people?
 Do we have genuine broad international support?

As Powell said in an April 1, 2009, interview on The Rachel Maddow Show, it denotes a nation's exhausting of all "political, economic, and diplomatic means", which, only if all were futile, would result in the condition that the nation should resort to military force. Powell has also asserted that when a nation is engaging in war, every resource and tool should be used to achieve decisive force against the enemy, minimizing casualties and ending the conflict quickly by forcing the weaker force to capitulate.

Analysis and commentary
The Powell Doctrine has been reported as an emerging legacy from the Korea and Vietnam wars and the "Never Again vs. Limited War" policy debates (either win or don't start versus value of limited war) and Weinberger's Six Tests described in his 1984 speech "The Uses of Military Power".  It has been used to compare the Vietnam War, the Gulf War, and the Iraq War.

See also
Bush Doctrine
Just war theory
Pottery Barn rule
Reagan Doctrine
Shock and awe
Weinberger Doctrine

References

Further reading
 Campbell, Kenneth J. "Once Burned, Twice Cautious: Explaining the Weinberger-Powell Doctrine." Armed Forces & Society 24#3 (1998): 357–74.
 LaFeber, Walter. "The rise and fall of Colin Powell and the Powell Doctrine." Political Science Quarterly 124.1 (2009): 71–93. online
 MacMillan, John. "After Interventionism: A Typology of United States Strategies." Diplomacy & Statecraft 30.3 (2019): 576–601. online
 Meiertöns, Heiko. The Doctrines of US Security Policy: An Evaluation under International Law, Cambridge University Press (2010), .
 Middup, Luke. The Powell Doctrine and US Foreign Policy (Ashgate, 2015) online.
 O'Sullivan, Christopher D. Colin Powell: American Power and Intervention From Vietnam to Iraq, New York: Rowman and Littlefield Publishers, (2009)
 Record, Jeffrey. "Back to the Weinberger-Powell Doctrine?" Strategic Studies Quarterly, no. Fall (2007): 79–95.
 Walt, Stephen. "Applying the 8 Questions of the Powell Doctrine to Syria." Foreign Policy (September 13, 2013). online
 Yeatman, Scott T. "Modifying the Weinberger-Powell Doctrine for the Modern Geo-Strategic Environment." (NDU/JFSC Joint Advanced Warfighting School, 2017) online.

Primary sources
 Powell, Colin L.  "U.S. Forces: Challenges Ahead." Foreign Affairs; Winter 1992, Vol. 71 Issue 5, 32–45, 14p  online
 Powell, Colin L. and Joseph E. Persico. My American Journey  (1995), autobiography.

Military doctrines
Foreign policy doctrines of the United States
1990 in the United States
1990 in international relations